= Round & About Magazine =

English monthly regional magazine

- Editor (Bucks, Oxon & Wilts): Liz Nicholls
- Editor (Berks, Hants & Surrey): Karen Neville
- Categories: Regional Circulation
- Frequency: Monthly
- Format: A5
- Circulation: 620,166
- Publisher: Chris Savage
- Founder: Peter Savage
- Founded: 1994
- First issue: April 1994, Wallingford
- Company: Round & About Publications Limited
- Country: United Kingdom
- Based in: Wallingford, Oxfordshire, United Kingdom
- Language: English
- Website: https://roundandabout.co.uk/
- OCLC: 51104298

Round & About Magazine is a monthly regional magazine published by Round & About Publications Ltd. The community-based brand publishes coverage of local news and events along with publishing articles on the home and gardens, health, food, recipes and events.

The magazine, delivered by Royal Mail, covers six counties across Southern England: Berkshire, Buckinghamshire, Hampshire, Oxfordshire, Surrey and Wiltshire. This coverage has grown to include 31 localised editions reaching a total circulation of 620,166.

== Early history ==
- In April 1994, the first Round & About magazine was published in Wallingford by its founder Peter Savage.
- In 1995, operations moved out of the home office and into a commercial office.
- In 2010, Peter Savage stepped down and his son, Christopher Savage takes over as Managing Director.
- In 2014, the office moved to Howberry Business Park, Wallingford where it still stands in 2025.
- In 2016, Round & About hosted the first of two local food festivals.

== Awards ==
The magazine won two golds for Commercial Team of the Year and Regional Media Brand of the Year at the British Media Awards 2019^{[}.
